Bharat Vishnu Ratra (born 26 January 1960) is an Indian-American physicist, theoretical cosmologist and astroparticle physicist who is currently a university distinguished professor of Physics at Kansas State University.

He is known for his work on dynamical dark energy and on the quantum-mechanical generation of energy density and magnetic field fluctuations during inflation.

Biography 

Ratra was born in Bombay (Mumbai). He graduated with a Master of Science in physics from the Indian Institute of Technology Delhi in 1982 and completed his doctorate in physics at Stanford University in 1986 under the supervision of Leonard Susskind and Michael Peskin.

Ratra was a postdoctoral fellow at the Stanford Linear Accelerator Center, Princeton University, the California Institute of Technology and the Massachusetts Institute of Technology. He joined Kansas State University in 1996 as an assistant professor of physics. He was promoted to associate professor in 2001 and professor in 2004.

Academics and research 

Ratra has worked in a number of areas of cosmology and astroparticle and early universe physics.

In 1988, Ratra and Jim Peebles of Princeton University proposed the first dynamical dark energy scalar field, or quintessence, model. Dark energy is the leading candidate for the mechanism that is responsible for causing the observed accelerated cosmological expansion.

Ratra and his students and collaborators have pioneered measurements of the redshift of the transition between an earlier epoch when cosmological expansion decelerated because dark and baryonic (ordinary) matter dominated the cosmological energy budget and the current epoch where the cosmological expansion accelerates because dark energy dominates the current cosmological energy budget.  

Ratra's early universe research includes the first consistent semi-classical computation of the spectrum of energy density perturbations from inflation. He collaborated with Willy Fischler of the University of Texas at Austin and Leonard Susskind of Stanford University on this computation.

Ratra also proposed the first inflation model that can generate, from quantum fluctuations, a large-enough primordial cosmological magnetic field to be able to explain observed galactic magnetic fields.

Honours 

 National Science Foundation CAREER award (1999)
 Fellow of the American Physical Society (2002)
 Fellow of the American Association for the Advancement of Science (2005)
 Olin Petefish Award in Basic Science (2017)

References

External links 

 13 February 2017 University of Kansas Colloquium: Dark Energy: constant or time variable? (... and other open questions)
 5 November 2019 Kansas State University Colloquium: The Accelerating Expanding Universe: Dark Matter, Dark Energy, and Einstein's Cosmological Constant, or Why Jim Peebles was Awarded Half of the 2019 Physics Nobel Prize

1960 births
Living people
21st-century American physicists
20th-century Indian physicists
American people of Indian descent
Scientists from Mumbai
Cosmologists
Stanford University alumni
Kansas State University faculty
IIT Delhi alumni
Fellows of the American Physical Society
Fellows of the American Association for the Advancement of Science